Isla Gallo, is an island in the Gulf of California east of the Baja California Peninsula. The island is uninhabited and is part of the La Paz Municipality.

Biology
Isla Gallo has five species of reptile, including Phyllodactylus unctus (San Lucan leaf-toed gecko), Sauromalus ater (common chuckwalla), Sceloporus hunsakeri (Hunsaker's spiny lizard), Urosaurus nigricauda (black-tailed brush lizard), and Uta stansburiana (common side-blotched lizard).

References

Islands of Baja California Sur
Islands of the Gulf of California
Uninhabited islands of Mexico